BalFolk is a dance event for folk dance and folk music in a number of European countries, mainly in France, Belgium, the Netherlands, Germany, Italy and Poland. It is also known as folk bal.

History
Dancing to folk music has been gaining popularity since the 1970s. The traditional dances come primarily from the French tradition, with additions from all parts of Europe.

There are numerous organizations that organize such dance events monthly and at many folk festivals there are both concerts and dances.

In France some villages have their own annual folk festival.

In Flanders, Boombal is the biggest organization for the popularization of bal folk. Their influence is so great that the term Boombal is more known than the term bal folk.

Although there are similarities, the dances of bal folk are not the same as dances danced by traditional folkdance groups.
Traditional folk dances have more extensive choreographies and may be danced with traditional clothing. The preservation and/or presentation of a tradition is important here. Music is sometimes played live, sometimes pre-recorded. The audience sits down and watches the dancers perform their choreographies.
Dances of bal folk are generally based on simple traditional choreographies and have an easy base so everyone can easily start with it. Refined movements are not the main concern, improvisation is more common. Often, the music has modern influences. Music is played by live bands. The audience is on the dance floor, dancing to the live music.

Parts of a Balfolk

Initiation / Dance Workshop: A Balfolk may include one or more workshops for Beginners or intermediates shortly before the real Bal commences. Often the workshops are also accompanied by live music.
Bal: One or more Folk musicians or Folk music groups play for dancing. Unlike some other dancing events, it is unusual to dance with a permanent dance partner. One of the characteristics of Balfolk is that the participants range from the very young to the very old.
Jam: after certain bals, dancers who brought an instrument sit in the middle of the dance floor and play tunes for the dancers.

Common dances
The types of dance which are commonly included during such a session:
 Schottische
 Bourrée
 Waltz
 Polka
 Branle
 Contra dance
 Mazurka (also known as Belgian or Flemish Mazurka as there is a difference from the original Mazurka)
 Polska
 Chapelloise, also known as a Gigue (a different dance from the Irish Jig)
 The "Circassian circle", a mixer dance
 Breton dances like the "Ridée", "Laridé", "Andro", "Hanter Dro" and "Kost ar c'hoat" 
 Ronds (many also from Brittany, but also from other parts of France, e.g. Occitania and Poitou)

References

Sources
 Yves Guilcher, La danse traditionelle en France: d´une ancienne civilisation paysanne à loisir revivaliste, Librairie de la Danse, FAMDT, 1998 Courlay

External links
 Pentreffest, traditional European music and dance in Wales (based in Cardiff)
On Bouge London, London's long-running European French & Breton dance club
 Soas French Folk Dance Society, London
Musictrad (in French) (France)
List of UK events (UK)
List of events in Europe
BalFolk (Netherlands)
Frisse Folk (Belgium)
Folkroddels (Belgium)
Folkfreun.de (Germany)
BalLibre (BalFolk CreativeCommons interactive playList)
Balfolk Music Database
Balfolkworkshop.com

Dance festivals in Germany
Dance festivals in Belgium
Dance festivals in France
Dance festivals in the Netherlands
Folk dance
Social dance